Yongnian is an urban district of the city of Handan, Hebei province, China. It is the seat of the Roman Catholic Diocese of Yongnian.

History

During the middle ages, the region was known as Ming Prefecture and administered from Mingzhou, now known as Guangfu. Guangfu continued to serve as the local seat of government when Ming Prefecture first became Guangping Prefecture and then Yongnian County. The area's population was about 220,000 in 1491; 1,225,408 in 1820; 1,101,876 in 1883; and 1,734,036 in 1946.

Administrative Divisions
Towns:
Linluoguan, Dabeiwang, Guangfu, Yonghehui, Nanyancun, Zhangxibao

Townships:
Xiaolongma Township, Xiaoxibao Township, Zhengxi Township, Dongyangzhuang Township, Xiyangcheng Township, Xisu Township, Xihezhuang Township, Qumo Township, Liuhan Township, Jiangwu Township, Liuying Township, Xinzhuangbao Township, Jiehedian Township, Yaozhai Township

Climate

References

Citations

Bibliography
 . * .

County-level divisions of Hebei
Handan